Juvenile Justice is a 2022 South Korean streaming television series. Directed by Hong Jong-chan, it stars Kim Hye-soo, Kim Mu-yeol, and Lee Sung-min. The series, which tells the story of a judge who is known for her dislike of juveniles and gets appointed as judge of a juvenile court, was released on Netflix on February 25, 2022.

Synopsis
Juvenile Justice follows the story of Shim Eun-seok, an elite judge with a cold and distant personality, who is known for her dislike of juveniles, as she becomes a newly appointed judge of a juvenile court in the Yeonhwa District. There, she breaks customs and administers her own ways of punishing the offenders. She has to deal with and balance her aversion to minor offenders with firm beliefs on justice and punishment as she tackles complex cases while discovering what being an adult truly means.

The court-room drama sends a message of how society is also responsible for juveniles' acts.

Cast

Main
 Kim Hye-soo as Shim Eun-seok, a stern judge of the Juvenile Court with a bitter past that shaped how she perceived juvenile offenders
 Kim Mu-yeol as Cha Tae-joo, a compassionate judge of the Juvenile Court with a past history as a victim of domestic abuse and being in juvenile reformation center. He believes in giving second chances to juveniles as he views them as redeemable as a result of his juvenile past
 Lee Sung-min as Kang Won-joong, chief of Juvenile Justice Division
 Lee Jung-eun as Na Geun-hee, who succeed Kang Won-joong as chief of the Juvenile Justice Division. She is the polar opposite of Eun-seok regarding their stance towards the sentencing of juvenile offenders

Supporting

Juvenile Offenders 
 Lee Yeon as Baek Seong-woo, Conspirator in the Yeonhwa Elementary School Murder Case. 
 Hwang Hyeon-jeong as Han Ye-eun, The main culprit in the Yeonhwa Elementary School murder case.
 Jo Mi-nyeo as Woo Seol-ah, Juvenile pickpocket criminal
 Shim Dal-gi as Seo Yu-ri 
 Song Duk-ho as Kwak Do-seok  
A driver in episodes 7 and 8, involved in the minor unlicensed driving accident
 Kim Do-gun as Seo Dong-gyun
 Kim Bo-young as Choi Young-na
 Kim Jun-ho as Kang Shin-woo, Kang Won-joong's son and is involved in exam cheating cases.
 Lee Bom as Gyu-sang's wife
 Lee Seok-hyung as Lee Nam-kyung, A boy who goes to court in a traffic accident case without a license for minors.
 Kim Gyun-ha as 'Baek Do-hyun', a brutal juvenile criminal leader. Back in his childhood, at age eleven, Do-hyun and his friend Hwang In-jun murdered Shim Eun-seok's son Nam-goong Chan but were acquitted of the crime; he and In-jun both later appear in court for a sexual offence.

Victim's parents and offenders 
 Song Duk-ho 
 Kim Chan-hyung as Ji-hoo's biological father
 Park Bo-kyung as Ji Hoo's mother 
 Kim Do-geon 
 Jang Dae-woong

Yeonhwa District Court 
Park Ji-yeon as Woo Soo-mi, Director of the Juvenile Criminal Compromise Unit	
 Lee Sang-hee as Joo Young-sil, Officers involved in juvenile criminal deals. 
 Shin Jae-hwi as Seo-bum, Executive Officer of the Juvenile Criminal Agreement
 Keum Kwang-sun as Han Kyung-Jung, Judicial Police Inspector under the Ministry of Justice

Pureum Youth Recovery Center 
 Yeom Hye-ran as Oh Seon-ja, Director of Pureum Youth Recovery Center.
 Jung Yi-soo as Kim Ah-reum, Oh Seon-ja's daughter. 
 Yoon Seo-ah as Go Hye-rim 
 Choi Ji-soo as Oh Yeon-ji 
 Jo Yoon-soo as Yoon Eun-jeong 
 Ha i-aan as Woo Min-kyeong 
 Park Chae-hee as Kim Ah-jin 
 Kim Jung-yoon as Yeo-eun 
 Cho hyun seo as Han Min-joo

Others 
 Kim Joo-hun as Namkoong Yi-hwan, prosecutor of Supreme Prosecutor Office and Sim Eun-seok's ex-husband.
 Kim Young-ah as Heo Chan-mi, A member of Geobo Law Firm, a lawyer in charge of Han Ye-eun and Shim Eun-seok, a classmate of a training academy.
 Park Jong-hwan as Go Gang-sik, Police officers dealing with cases of violence against children, women, youth and domestic violence
Yoo Jae-myung as Um Joon-gi, an assemblyman
 Park Jung-yoon as Do Yoo-kyung
 Shin Yeon-woo as Chi-hyeon, a detective in the female youth division. She solves child cases together as a partner of the same department head Go Kang-sik.
 Jung Soo-bin as Baek Mi-joo, A young criminal in an unlicensed hit-and-run case.
 Jeon Guk-hyang as Yoo Hye-sun

Production

Development
Netflix in November 2020 confirmed the production of original series Juvenile Justice. It was also confirmed that Hong Jong-chan will direct the series with Kim Hye-soo playing Sim Eun-seok, a newly appointed judge. The series will revolve around issues of the juvenile statutes, and daily lives and concerns of juvenile court judges. On January 27, 2023, it was reported that the production of season 2 has been canceled.

Casting
In December 2020 casting of Kim Mu-yeol and Lee Sung-min as main lead was confirmed.

Filming
On May 4, it was reported that Kim Hye-soo was filming Netflix's series Juvenile Justice.

Reception

Audience response
Juvenile Justice for 2 weeks in a row from February 28 to March 6, and March 7 to March 13, with 45.93 million and 25.94 million viewing hours respectively was at 1st place in Global Top 10 weekly list of the most-watched Netflix TV shows (Non-English).

Critical response
Jonathon Wilson of Ready Steady Cut graded the TV series with 3 stars out of 5 and praised the performance of Kim Hye-soo but criticised the screenplay. Wilson wrote, "Kim Hye-soo delivers a tremendous performance here that the writing doesn’t always support."  He criticised the series for lacking clarity of view in protagonist writing, "I don’t subscribe to the belief that all TV shows need a “likable” protagonist, but most need a clear point of view." In conclusion Wilson opined, "Juvenile Justice, like the young offenders whose various macabre crimes it chronicles, never realizes its full potential."

Joel Keller of Decider reviewing the series wrote, "Juvenile Justice is about as close to an American-style procedural as Netflix or Korean TV gets. We hope we get a little more backstory on the main character, but the cases might just be compelling enough to keep our interest."

Pierce Conran of the South China Morning Post gave 3 stars out of 5 and wrote, "A grounded actors showcase that explores juvenile delinquency in a tightly woven frame of jurisprudence which occasionally shifts into a very melodramatic gear."

Awards and nominations

References

External links
 
 
 
 Juvenile Justice at Daum 

2022 South Korean television series debuts
2020s South Korean television series 
2022 South Korean television series endings
Korean-language Netflix original programming
South Korean legal television series
South Korean web series
South Korean workplace television series